Air Vice Marshal Sidney Norman Webster,  (19 March 1900 – 5 April 1984) was a senior officer in the Royal Air Force and an aviator who flew the winning aircraft in the 1927 Schneider Trophy seaplane race.

Early life
Sidney Norman Webster was born in Walsall on 9 March 1900. He joined the Royal Air Force in September 1918 and trained as a pilot. He was awarded the Air Force Cross in 1921. In 1927 he was selected as part of the British team to contest the 1929 Schneider Trophy.

From 1925 to 1930, Webster was posted to RAF Martlesham in Suffolk. An accomplished soccer player, who represented Walsall schools, Webster was picked up by Ipswich Town – then in the southern amateur League – and went on to play 69 times for them, mostly at left-back, including as club captain for one season.

Schneider Trophy
After training Webster and the British team moved to Venice, Italy to prepare for the race against Italy, and the United States. After winning the trophy Webster was awarded a Bar to his Air Force Cross. The citation for the award read:

Webster left the High Speed Flight and after a tour as a flight commander in 1933 he was seconded to the Egyptian Government until 1939.

Second World War
Webster used his experience of high speed flight as he acted as a liaison officer between the Air Ministry and various aircraft manufacturers in the United Kingdom. In 1944 he moved to the Marine Aircraft Experimental Establishment as commanding officer. He was appointed a Commander of the Order of the British Empire in the 1946 New Year Honours.

Post-war
After the war Webster had two tours of duty with Coastal Command in between he was Air Officer Commanding RAF Hong Kong, he retired in 1950.

References

1900 births
1984 deaths
Royal Air Force air marshals
British air racers
Commanders of the Order of the British Empire
English aviators
People from Walsall
Graduates of the Royal Air Force College Cranwell
Recipients of the Air Force Cross (United Kingdom)
Schneider Trophy pilots